Ivanovo is a village in northeastern Bulgaria, part of Rousse Province. It is the administrative centre of Ivanovo Municipality, which lies in the central part of Rousse Province.

Ivanovo is located 20 kilometres south of the provincial capital of Rousse, in the eastern Danubian Plain. The village is famous for the Rock-hewn Churches of Ivanovo, a UNESCO World Heritage Site medieval group of monolithic Eastern Orthodox churches, chapels and cave monasteries hewn out of solid rock in the vicinity of Ivanovo. The monastical complex was active from the early 13th to the 17th century.

Gallery

External links

 Ivanovo municipality page at the Rousse Province website 

Villages in Ruse Province